Censorinus was a Roman grammarian and miscellaneous writer from the 3rd century AD.

Biography
He was the author of a lost work De Accentibus and of an extant treatise De Die Natali, written in 238, and dedicated to his patron Quintus Caerellius as a birthday gift. The contents are of a varied character: the natural history of man, the influence of the stars and genii, music, religious rites, astronomy, the doctrines of the Greek philosophers, and antiquarian subjects.

The second part deals with chronological and mathematical questions, and has been of great service in determining the principal epochs of ancient history. The whole is full of curious and interesting information. The style is clear and concise, although somewhat rhetorical, and the —for the period—good.

The chief authorities used were Varro and Suetonius. Some scholars, indeed, hold that the entire work is practically an adaptation of the lost Pratum of Suetonius. The fragments of a work De Naturali Institutione, dealing with astronomy, geometry, music, and versification, and usually printed with the De Die Natali of Censorinus, are not by him. Part of the original manuscript, containing the end of the genuine work, and the title and name of the author of the fragment are lost.

A bright crater in the Sea of Tranquility on the Moon has been named after him.

Works

References

Notes

Bibliography
 Good edition with commentary by Heinrich Lindenbrog (1614)
 Critical editions by
 Otto Jahn (1845)
 Friedrich Hultsch (1867)
 Ivan Cholodniak (1889)
 Kai Brodersen (2012)
 English translation of the De Die Natali (the first eleven chapters being omitted) with notes by William Maude (New York, 1900)
 
 New English translation of the De Die Natali by Holt N. Parker (trans.): Censorinus. The Birthday Book.  Chicago: The University of Chicago Press, 2007.  Pp. xiv, 102.  
 New German translation by Kai Brodersen (trans.): Censorinus. Das Geburtstagsbuch. Darmstadt: Primus, 2011.  Pp. 120.  
 New critical edition with German translation by Kai Brodersen: Censorinus. Über den Geburtstag (Edition Antike). Darmstadt: WBG, 2012.  Pp. 160.

External links
 de Die natali at LacusCurtius (Latin text, French translation: Cholodniak's edition)
 Corpus Grammaticorum Latinorum: complete texts and full bibliography

3rd-century Romans
Grammarians of Latin
3rd-century Latin writers
Ancient Roman antiquarians